Abraham Lincoln Lewis (1865–1947) was an influential American businessman who founded the Afro-American Life Insurance Company in Jacksonville, Florida and became the state's first African-American millionaire. He also founded the National Register-listed community of American Beach, founded as a prestigious vacation spot for blacks during the period of racial segregation.

Business legacy
Along with seven other business associates, Lewis founded the Afro-American Insurance Association in 1901. The company headquarters burned down in the Great Fire of 1901, but Lewis and the others relocated the business to Lewis' home and renamed it the Afro-American Life Insurance Company. During this time Lewis served as treasurer, and  he became the president of Afro-American Life in 1919. Eventually the company acquired Chathorn Mutual Life Insurance Company and expanded into Georgia.

Lewis helped to found both the Negro Business League and the National Negro Insurance Association. He was a heavy contributor to black colleges such as Jacksonville's Edward Waters College as well as Bethune-Cookman College.

Due to the Jim Crow laws of the day, blacks were not allowed to enjoy many basic recreational amenities. A.L. Lewis realized the need for African Americans to have recreational activities for their families, so he founded the Lincoln Golf and Country Club, which featured a clubhouse and facilities. In 1935, Lewis purchased  of Nassau County beachfront land along the Atlantic Ocean. Blacks were not permitted on most beaches in Jacksonville, and it was Lewis' dream to create a community where African Americans could visit and own reasonably-priced homes along the ocean. This community, which he named American Beach, was a thriving vacation spot throughout the 1930s, 40s, and 50s. Summers at American Beach were known for being jammed with families, churches and children. The beach included hotels, restaurants and nightclubs as well as homes and other businesses.

A.L. Lewis died in 1947 and was interred in the family crypt in a historic black Jacksonville cemetery. The grave is along the road with a plaque marker placed by the city inscribed with his biography. There is a street as well as a youth center named in his honor. Lewis married Mary Kingsley Sammis, the great granddaughter of Zephaniah Kingsley, a slaveowner and trader, and his wife and former slave Anna Magjigine Jai, whose homestead on Fort George Island is preserved as Kingsley Plantation. All three of his grandchildren are achievers: MaVynee Betsch was known for educating the public on their family history and her efforts to preserve American Beach. Dr. Johnnetta B. Cole became the first woman to serve as president of two major universities, Spelman College and Bennett College. John Betsch is an internationally acclaimed jazz drummer.

Citations

External links
Lewis biography at the Governor's Office Black History Month site

His Great-Great Granddaughter Renee Lewis Glover is Executive Director  of the Atlanta Housing Authority

1865 births
1947 deaths
African-American businesspeople
History of Jacksonville, Florida
People from Jacksonville, Florida
Businesspeople from Florida
African-American history in Jacksonville, Florida
20th-century African-American people